Guy Edward Fletcher (born 24 May 1960) is an English multi-instrumentalist, best known for his position as one of the two keyboard players in the rock band Dire Straits from 1984 until the group's dissolution, and his subsequent work with Dire Straits frontman Mark Knopfler. Fletcher was inducted into the Rock and Roll Hall of Fame as a member of Dire Straits in 2018.

Biography
Guy Edward Fletcher was born into a musical family and is the namesake of his uncle, Guy Fletcher, who wrote several hit songs for other artists with composing partner Doug Flett. His mother Barbara was a session singer and his father Ted Fletcher, an audio designer, (Orbitsound) created a line of audio equipment named after Joe Meek with whom he had worked.

Fletcher is also the cousin of children's entertainer Justin Fletcher.

Whilst learning a trade as an audio engineer at DJM Studios in London at the age of 15, Fletcher also had a succession of his own bands and learned to play keyboards, guitars, and a variety of stringed instruments. He joined and toured with Steve Harley & Cockney Rebel in 1979 and in 1981, Roxy Music for their 'Avalon' world tour. In 1983, Fletcher was recruited by Dire Straits' lead guitarist Mark Knopfler to work on the music for the films Cal and Comfort and Joy. He joined Dire Straits in 1984, a year before their most successful album, Brothers in Arms, which put the band in a global spotlight.

In 1986, Fletcher co-produced Belouis Some's album Belouis Some with Gary Langan.

In 1996, Fletcher toured as part of Bryan Ferry's band on his Mamouna world tour.

Following the disbanding of Dire Straits in 1995, Fletcher continued his association with band founder Mark Knopfler as a core member of his band after launching his solo career. In 2005, Fletcher completed a world tour promoting Knopfler's 2004 solo album, Shangri-La, and in 2006 rounded off the duets tour with Knopfler and Emmylou Harris. Fletcher co-produced and played keyboards on his Knopfler's album, Get Lucky, and was again part of his subsequent world tour in 2010.

Solo work
Fletcher's first solo album, Inamorata, was released on 28 January 2008. Knopfler guested as lead guitarist for two tracks, and various musicians who have been associated with Knopfler's band also made appearances.

Fletcher's second album, Stone, was released in 2009; his third, Natural Selection was released in 2010 with High Roads, being released in 2016.

His latest album, "Anomaly" was released April 22nd 2022.

Personal life
Guy lives with his wife Laura, and their two children, Max and Leon, in Aldwick, West Sussex.

Discography

With Roxy Music 
 The High Road - Live E.P. (1983) 
 Heart Still Beating - Live Album (1990

Soundtrack albums  
 Cal (1984)
 Comfort and Joy (1984)
 The Princess Bride (1987)
 Last Exit to Brooklyn (1989)
 Wag the Dog (1998)
 Metroland (1999)
 A Shot at Glory (2002)
 Altamira (2016) with Evelyn Glennie

With Bryan Ferry 
 Boys and Girls – Bryan Ferry (1985) - Guy keyboards on track 2
 Mamouna – Bryan Ferry (1994) - Guy synthesizers on track 10

With Dire Straits 
 Brothers in Arms (1985)
 Money for Nothing - Compilation - Guy keyboards on Walk of life and Brothers in Arms. (1988)
 On Every Street (1991) 
 On the Night (1993) 
 Encores (1993) 
 Sultans of Swing: The Very Best of Dire Straits - Compilation (1998) 
 Private Investigations: The Best of Dire Straits & Mark Knopfler (2005)

With The Notting Hillbillies 
Missing...Presumed Having a Good Time (1990)

With Mark Knopfler and Chet Atkins 
 Neck and Neck (1990) - Guy Fletcher  : Drums, bass, keyboards. 

 With Mark Knopfler 
 Golden Heart – (1996)
 Sailing to Philadelphia – (2000)
 The Ragpicker's Dream – (2002)
 Shangri-La – (2004)
 Kill to Get Crimson –(2007)
 Get Lucky – (2009)
 Privateering – (2012)
 Tracker – (2015)
 Down the Road Wherever – (2018)

 With Mark Knopfler & Emmylou Harris  
 All the Roadrunning – (2006) 
 Real Live Roadrunning – (2006)

With Blues Club  
 Rollin' & Tumblin' (Volume 1) (2011)

Collaborations 
 Knife – Aztec Camera (1984)
 She's the Boss – Mick Jagger (1985)
 Break Every Rule – Tina Turner (1986)
 Save the Last Dance for Me – Ben E. King (1987)
 Land of Dreams – Randy Newman (1988)
 Siren – Heather Nova (1998)

Solo 
 Inamorata (28 January 2008)
 Stone (16 October 2009)
 Natural Selection (24 May 2010)
 High Roads (2016)
 Anomaly (2022)

References

External links

 GuyFletcher.co.uk

1960 births
Living people
English keyboardists
English male guitarists
English session musicians
English record producers
People from Maidstone
Dire Straits members
Musicians from Kent
The Notting Hillbillies members